John Ehret High School is a four-year public high school serving grades 9–12 located in unincorporated Jefferson Parish, Louisiana, United States, near Marrero. The school, a part of the Jefferson Parish Public Schools, serves several communities. Its service area includes portions of Marrero CDP, Harvey, Estelle, and Woodmere.

John Ehret High School currently ranks as a "B" school, according to the Louisiana Department of Education, and includes college Dual Enrollment, Advanced Placement, and a Gifted program. In addition, students have access to Music and Arts programs such as: Band, Music, Art, Theatre, and Digital Media. Sports at John Ehret High School include: football, soccer, basketball, indoor and outdoor track and field, volleyball, softball, baseball, wrestling, and spirit.

The school's mascot is the Patriot, and its colors are red, white, and blue.  During Hurricane Katrina, the school suffered wind damage to many of its buildings.

History
In November 2019 parents of a student with muscular dystrophy filed a lawsuit against the district on the grounds that Ehret High did not accommodate him.

Due to the COVID-19 pandemic in the United States, John Ehret High School stopped in-person classes on March 15, 2020, per Governor John Bel Edwards's orders. The 2020–2021 school year began with students having the option to attend school virtually or in a hybrid model.

Activities
Historically Delgado Community College held evening classes at Ehret.

School uniforms
The school requires its students to wear school uniforms.

Extracurricular activities

Clubs

4-H club
Academic Games
African-American Studies
AFJROTC (Defunct)
Alice Paul Society
Alpha & Omega club
Band
Beta club
Broadcast Team
Chess club
Close-Up
Robotics club
Executive Suite
French Honor Society
Gardening club
Gay Straight Alliance (GSA)
Chorus
Key club
Leadership
Library club
Mock Trial Team
Medical Academy 
 music club
Mu Alpha Theta
National Honor Society
Newspaper club
Peer Mediation
Philosophy Society
Prostart
Quiz Bowl
SAPE
Sign Language 
Student Council
interACT club

Athletics
John Ehret High athletics competes in the LHSAA.

Sports sponsored by the school: 

Baseball
Boys' basketball 
Girls' basketball
Cheerleading
Cross Country
Dance Team
Flag team
Football
Majorettes
Pep squad
Soccer
Softball
Track & field
Volleyball
Wrestling

Championships
Football championships
(2) State Championships: 1981, 1985

Boys' basketball championships
(2) State Championships: 1993, 2006

Boys' basketball championship history
The boys' basketball team won the Class 5A state championship for the 1992–93 and 2005–06 school years. The team was the subject of an article in the April 2006 issue of Sports Illustrated, and ESPN featured the team's success on SportsCenter. The team was honored with an Award at the 2006 ESPYS. The team was also the subject of the 2010 film Hurricane Season.

Notable alumni

Kimberly Willis Holt – writer of children's literature
Girod Jackson III – former member of the Louisiana House of Representatives for Jefferson Parish; general contractor in Harvey
Drake Nevis – defensive tackle with the Winnipeg Blue Bombers of the CFL
Frank Ocean (born Christopher Lonny Edwin Breaux) – Grammy award winning singer-songwriter
Elfrid Payton – NBA basketball player with the Phoenix Suns
Kordell Stewart – former NFL quarterback with the Pittsburgh Steelers, Chicago Bears and Baltimore Ravens
Reggie Wayne – former NFL wide receiver with the Indianapolis Colts
Rio Wells – former defensive back with the Fresno State Bulldogs and Edmonton Eskimos
Darrel Williams – NFL running back
Lucky Daye (born David Brown) - Singer-songwriter
Michael Divinity – Football player
De'Jon Harris – NFL player

References

External links

Public high schools in Louisiana
Schools in Jefferson Parish, Louisiana